The Magdalena Medio Province is  a subregion of the Colombian Department of Bolívar.

References 

Provinces of Bolívar Department